is a railway station located in Nishimachi 2-chōme (西町2丁目), Pippu, Kamikawa District, Hokkaidō, and is operated by the Hokkaidō Railway Company.

Lines serviced
JR Hokkaidō
Sōya Main Line

Adjacent stations

External links
Ekikara Time Table - JR Pippu Station (Japanese)

Railway stations in Hokkaido Prefecture
Railway stations in Japan opened in 1898